A compliance car is an alternative fuel vehicle that is explicitly designed to meet tightening government regulations for low-emission vehicle sales, while the automobile manufacturer restricts sales to specific jurisdictions to meet the rules, or limits production, or both.

While the introduction of compliance cars by the largest car manufacturers is sometimes explained by the companies arguing that they could not manufacture electric cars profitably and sell them for more than their cost to produce them, another mechanism could be behind the auto companies practice of releasing EVs only in limited quantities and in limited markets. Since Tesla has shown profitability producing electric vehicles—with four consecutive quarters of company profitability as of July 2020—the large legacy manufacturers could also be facing the dilemma of the Osborne Effect. They are behind Tesla in building both the battery technology and EV assembly/service expertise of the frontrunner, while facing the inexorable problem that announcing high-quality mass market new EV vehicles will eat into the present sales of the internal combustion engine cars they currently produce in volume, and the exclusive current source of company profits.

History 

Legislative authority to add the force of government mandates on automobile manufacturers to increase the penetration of electric and hybrid automobiles into the operating "fleet" of all automobiles have been put in place in several national jurisdictions, notably the United States and Europe.

Although the General Motors EV1 was conceived as an electric vehicle to be built from the ground up in the late 1990s, a significant part of the rationale for designing and producing the "mass-produced" EV was to meet the environmental mandates then coming in the US, initially in California. The EV1 was available in only a few select local markets in the US, was not sold but available only by lease, and few vehicles—less than 1,200—were ever produced, with GM ending production in 1999. The EV1 was therefore a compliance car, albeit an innovative one that was much loved by customers. GM lobbied to get the early government mandate killed, and they were successful; GM then shut down the EV1 program by 2002 and recalled all leased vehicles by February 2002.

By 2012, the state of California—through legislative authority given to the California Air Resources Board (CARB)—successfully promulgated long-term regulations to require the six most popular automakers in the state (Honda, GM, Toyota, Nissan, Ford and Chrysler) to offer a zero-emissions vehicle ZEV. Failure to do so would result in losing the ability to sell any car in the region."
This led to the introduction of several compliance cars that were designed specifically to meet the CARB requirements, but were not intended for the broader US market, nor to be produced and sold in quantities that would meet demand for such vehicles in the open market, where no such government rules exist:
 Chevrolet Spark EV
 Fiat 500e
 Ford Focus Electric
 Honda Fit EV
 Toyota RAV4 EV
Subaru Crosstrek PHEV
Mazda MX-30
A few other states passed similar rules, adopting the California requirements; but most states have not chosen to mandate the production of electric vehicles.

Trade publication Autoguide reported in 2014 that "automakers are wary of the term 'compliance car' despite the fact that these cars exist for the sole purpose of being compliant with the rules set out by CARB regulators." Fiat had previously stated that they would not invest heavily in EV development beyond compliance vehicles.

Other EVs have been designed from the ground up, and are widely distributed; for example the Chevrolet Bolt EV and Nissan Leaf, and the Bolt and Leaf are therefore not considered a compliance car.

By 2016, a total of 12 states had adopted similar rules the CARB mandate.  The State of California had by then specified that 15.4% of an automaker's fleet must comply with ZEV rules by 2025.

By 2019, both Hyundai and Kia had introduced electric vehicles—Hyundai Kona Electric, Hyundai Ioniq Electric, Kia Niro EV, and Kia Soul EV—but the manufacturers are opting to sell these models only is a few states, and total production of all four models was to be limited to less than 20,000 units per year, for both 2019 and 2020. This compares to Tesla's sales of nearly 140,000 sales in the United States for just one model in 2018, the Tesla Model 3, and Chevrolet's production of 17,000 units for just one model, the Chevrolet Bolt. Hyundai and Kia resist calling their cars compliance cars simply because their production number projections are larger than the minimum required by the California mandate; further, Kia stated that they are selling the cars in three states beyond the ZEV-compliance states. Hyundai also sold 10,000 EVs in Korea during 2018. Auto analysts still consider the cars compliance cars because of the low production and limited distribution, not something a manufacturer would choose to do if they believed they could profitably sell their compliant EVs in volume at the prices they are offering them.

Description and limitations 

Many compliance cars are limited in their quantities, options, and availability to purchase.

Both Nissan and Tesla introduced cars before 2014 that were designed to be electric from the ground up, and have no limitations on either production or ownership, and make their electric vehicles available in all 50 US states. Their EVs thus avoided the term compliance car, despite easily meeting all requirements of the CARB regulations.

References 

Car classifications
Green vehicles